Solicoccozyma aeria is  a species of fungus in the family Piskurozymaceae. It has only been found in its yeast state, though a filamentous state producing basidia may be formed in culture.

Distribution
The species is an obligate aerobe, that has been isolated from soil samples and samples of sand.

Biochemistry
It has a growth temperature range between 20 °C and 35 °C. This species secretes amylase at the end of its exponential phase, and it is believed to produce the most amylase at 30 °C between pH 4.5 and pH 6. It is believed that the amylases that are produced by S. aeria are able to digest raw starch, and this ability to break down raw starch has been studied extensively, because the ability to find microorganisms that can break down raw starch has become increasingly important as the production of materials such as liquid fuel and chemicals using starch has become more prominent. This species' ability to break down starch is greatly improved when it is co-cultured with Saccharomyces cerevisiae. 

Solicoccozyma aeria is able to use glucose, galactose, maltose and starch as sole carbon sources, and it is able to use nitrate and nitrite as sole nitrogen sources.

References

External links 

Tremellomycetes